Billy Simmons (also known as Billy Simons) was an African-American Jew from Charleston, South Carolina, one of the few documented Black Jews living in the antebellum South. Simmons was a scholar in both Hebrew and Arabic.

Life
Simmons was born in Madagascar. Simmons claimed to be a descendant of a Rechabite tribe, a claim that was supported by two cantors and other Jewish authorities. Purchased by white Jewish slave owners, Simmons was taken into captivity and brought to South Carolina. He was owned as a slave by a newspaper editor in Charleston and his job was to deliver newspapers.

Despite anti-Black restrictions in the constitution of Kahal Kadosh Beth Elohim that banned Black converts from membership, Simmons was among the few African-American Jews known to have attended the synagogue during the antebellum period. Simmons attended the synagogue during the 1850s and was known to members as Uncle Billy. Simmons was known to attend Shabbat services wearing a black top hat, black suit, and frilly shirt.

See also
History of the Jews in Charleston, South Carolina
History of the Jews in Madagascar

References

1780 births
1860 deaths
18th-century American slaves
19th-century American slaves
Malagasy emigrants to the United States
African-American Jews
American people of Malagasy descent
American slaves literate in Arabic
Arabic-speaking people
Hebrew-speaking people
Jewish scholars
Jews and Judaism in Madagascar
People from Charleston, South Carolina
18th-century American Jews
19th-century American Jews
Jews and Judaism in South Carolina